Kitcharao, officially the Municipality of Kitcharao,  is a 4th class municipality in the province of Agusan del Norte, Philippines. According to the 2020 census, it has a population of 21,278 people.

History
Kitcharao was created on June 22, 1963, under Republic Act No. 3842, sponsored by Congressman Guillermo R. Sánchez. It was once a barrio of Jabonga. Through the initiative of the then Vice Mayor Francisco M. Tuozo of Jabonga, a resolution was sponsored petitioning Congress for the creation of the Municipality of Kitcharao.

The inhabitants of the municipality came from various regions in Luzon and the Visayas, hence the presence of Ilocanos, Tagalogs, Leyteños, Ilonggos, Warays, Cebuanos, Boholanos, and indigenous peoples known as the Mamanwa.

On August 29, 1963, the first Municipal Officials were inducted to the office by then Governor Democrito O. Plaza. Félix Q. Basadre, Sr. was the appointed Mayor, Marceliano Morada as Vice Mayor and the councilors Mariano M. Napalan, Sr., Gaudencio Pojas, Pencionico Bermúdez, Juan Tidalgo, Agustín Patagan and Uldarico Atuel.

The same set of Municipal Officials was elected in the ensuing regular election in November 1963.

In 2005, Barangays Crossing and Songkoy were created.

Geography
According to the Philippine Statistics Authority, the municipality has a land area of  constituting  of the  total area of Agusan del Norte.

Climate

Barangays
Kitcharao is politically subdivided into 11 barangays.

Demographics

In the 2020 census, Kitcharao had a population of 21,278.

Economy

Transportation
The Kitcharao Land Transport Terminal serves multicabs, buses, vans and jeepneys bound for Butuan/Surigao.

References

External links
 [ Philippine Standard Geographic Code]
 Community Website of Kitcharao

Municipalities of Agusan del Norte
Populated places on Lake Mainit